Katharine Berkoff (born January 28, 2001) is an American swimmer. She competed in the women's 4 × 100 metre freestyle relay event at the 2021 FINA World Swimming Championships (25 m) in Abu Dhabi.

References

External links
 

2001 births
Living people
American female freestyle swimmers
Place of birth missing (living people)
Medalists at the FINA World Swimming Championships (25 m)
Medalists at the 2019 Summer Universiade
Universiade gold medalists for the United States
Universiade medalists in swimming
World Aquatics Championships medalists in swimming